Audrey Truschke is a historian of South Asia and an associate professor at Rutgers University. Her work focuses on inter-community relations in medieval South Asia, especially during the Mughal Empire. In 2017, she was conferred with the John F. Richards Prize in South Asian History by American Historical Association.

Truschke has been a frequent target of harassment by right-wing Hindu nationalists, who accuse her of having prejudiced views on Hinduism, and making offensive statements; scholars reject the charges.

Education and career 

Truschke earned her bachelor's degree in religious studies from the University of Chicago in 2004. She earned her MA from Columbia University in Middle Eastern, South Asian, and African Studies in 2007 before going on to receive a MPhil in the same discipline in 2008. She received her PhD from Columbia University in 2012, and was a postdoctoral fellow at University of Cambridge (2012–2013) and Stanford University (2013–2016).

In 2015, Truschke joined Rutgers University as an assistant professor of South Asian history and in 2020, she was promoted to associate professorship.

Publications and reception

Monographs

Culture of Encounters: Sanskrit at the Mughal Court 
In 2016, Truschke's Culture of Encounters: Sanskrit at the Mughal Court, was published by Columbia University Press. It dwelt upon the literary, social, and political roles of Sanskrit in the Mughal courts from 1560 to 1650, and was reviewed in multiple journals.

Aria Fani, in the journal Iranian Studies, found the work to be an invaluable contribution to South Asian studies. Edmond Smith of the University of Kent, writing for Reviews in History, found the work to be "evocative, [and] expertly researched", where Truschke used her "exceptional linguistic talents" to pose and answer provoking questions about the Mughal Empire while inspiring other scholars to re-examine their approaches to studying religions.

Aurangzeb: The Life and Legacy of India's Most Controversial King 
In 2017, Truschke published Aurangzeb: The Life and Legacy of India's Most Controversial King about the Mughal emperor Aurangzeb, with Stanford University Press. Truschke, in her reading of sources, suggests that Aurangzeb was not the anti-Hindu tyrant he has been made out to be in popular scholarship; there was no "systematic" attack on Hindus and his sporadic destruction of temples or imposition of jizya must be interpreted from within a political and economical milieu.

Munis D. Faruqui, a historian of Mughal India, found the book to be an excellent work aimed at non-specialists, and praised Truschke's willingness to tackle the topic despite being aware about the inevitability of "vicious personal attacks from mostly nonacademic critics". However, Faruqui cautioned that the book "[did] not fill unexplored gaps in the historiography." Sara Mondini, a scholar of Indo-Islamic art and architecture, commended Truschke for having penned a "precise and exhaustive" volume on the subject with due regard to sources; it was far more "rich and complex" than the "stereotypical nationalist" ones prevailing in scholarship, and was "pivotal" to the understanding of Hindu-Muslim encounters in the premodern era.

The Language of History: Sanskrit Narratives of Indo-Muslim Rule 
Truschke's third monograph, The Language of History: Sanskrit Narratives of Indo-Muslim Rule, was published in January 2021 by Columbia University Press. Sheldon Pollock, Romila Thapar, Cynthia Talbot, and Richard M. Eaton provided blurbs for the publication.

Edited volumes 
In May 2021, Truschke co-edited "The Ramayana of Hamida Banu Begum, Queen Mother of Mughal India" which was published by Silvana Editoriale and Museum of Islamic Art, Doha.

Honors 
In 2017, Truschke was awarded the John F. Richards Prize in South Asian History by the American Historical Association for Culture of Encounters being the "most distinguished work of scholarship on South Asian history, [published in 2016]". She received the Rutgers Board of Trustees Research Fellowship for Scholarly Excellence in 2020.

Social media activity

Translation controversy 
In one of her tweets in 2018, Truschke, referring to an episode in the Ramayana, said that Sita had admonished Rama as a "misogynist pig"; she cited a critical translation of the Valmiki Ramayana by Robert P. Goldman in support. Goldman however denied that he ever used such language and deemed her choice of words to be "highly inappropriate". Truschke responded by stating that such disagreements are routine aspects of scholarly discourse and she had only offered a "loose translation" using contemporary language. According to Truschke, Goldman himself had used words like "pimp" in describing Sita's criticism of Rama and further, she was not endorsing Sita's criticism.

Srinivas Reddy, a professor of religious studies at Brown University, found Truschke's choice of words to lie in the extreme and missing contextual nuances; however, he supported her right to critically interpret epic characters and found subsequent attacks on her by the Hindu right to be misogynistic in essence, and deplorable. Highlighting how the Ramayana was not a dead text but a way of life in India, he urged Truschke to adopt a less polarizing voice in her analyses and respect the text, if not revere. Writer Purushottam Agrawal found the tweet to be inflammatory, disrespectful and poor; it reduced the layered and complex character of Rama to a "caricature in a contemporary American comic strip," noting that "'Prakrita' [is] a common word, which essentially means 'ordinary' or 'uncivilised', or 'raw' as opposed to refined." Cultural critic Pushpesh Pant found the translation to be poor, as well.

Targeting by the Hindu right 
Truschke has been a prominent critic of Hindutva and its exclusionary ideology. Due to her historical works and her choice of language, she has become a target of the Hindu right and has been a frequent recipient of hate mail. In 2021, Truschke, along with a group of other scholars, formed a collective to combat increasing harassment of South Asian scholars by people affiliated with Hindutva. They launched the "Hindutva Harassment Field Manual," offering "resources" against "Hindu Rights assault."

Aurangzeb 
After publishing her monograph on Aurangzeb, Truschke was accused of whitewashing his genocidal atrocities on Hindus and trolled by the Hindu right. Wendy Doniger noted these to be ad-hominem attacks infused with Islamophobia and misogyny.

Student petition 
In 2021, a group of Hindu students at Rutgers University circulated a petition calling for the university to disallow Truschke from teaching a course on Hinduism, condemn her views, and create "a safe space for diaspora Hindus". The petition alleged that Truschke held "inherently prejudiced views" on Hinduism and the Hindus. Among the alleged reasons were Truschke's claiming that the Bhagavad Gita rationalizes mass slaughter, linking Hindus with the 2021 storming of the United States Capitol, whitewashing the "trauma" inflicted on Hindus by Aurangzeb, and designing an undergraduate course to portray an "exotic-erotic-chauvinist-oppressive" view of Hindu India by relying on scholars like Wendy Doniger and focusing on the multiplicity of Ramayana among other errors of omission and commission.

The university, while defending academic freedom and calling for an immediate end to hate speech directed at her, said that it was initiating a dialogue with the Hindu community to understand their concerns. Days later, Rutgers faculty members from varied faith backgrounds (including Hinduism) drafted an open letter affirming faith in Truschke's scholarship, rejecting the levelled charges of "Hinduphobia", and applauding Rutgers' affirmation of academic liberty whilst upholding commitment to diversity. Among the signatories who expressed solidarity with those academics were Romila Thapar, Rajmohan Gandhi, Sheldon Pollock, Partha Chatterjee, and Suketu Mehta.

Litigation 
In May 2021, the Hindu American Foundation filed a libel suit against Truschke and representatives of several other organizations in the United States District Court for the District of Columbia. Truschke was represented by Cornell Law School's First Ammendment Clinic and Davis Wright Tremaine LLP. On 15 March 2022, judge Amit Mehta stayed Truschke and others' motions to dismiss the suit since he deemed one of their arguments about whether HAF had satisfied the second requirement of invoking diversity jurisdiction — by proving the amount of monetary loss to have exceeded 75,000 USD — as a "substantial question" of procedure, that needed to be settled prior to adjudication on merits. A discovery was ordered, and Judge Mehta accepted HAF's evidence to pass muster. Nonetheless, on 20 December 2022, he dismissed the suit since HAF had failed not only to establish any cause of action even assuming that their allegations were factually accurate but also evidence that the court had any personal jurisdiction over defendants.

A diverse group of intellectuals and academics—Akeel Bilgrami, Amitav Ghosh, Anita Desai, Cornel West, Martha Nussbaum, Nandini Sundar, Noam Chomsky, Romila Thapar, Sudipta Kaviraj, Sheldon Pollock, and Wendy Doniger among others—have condemned HAF's tactics as a strategic lawsuit against public participation to silence critics and push forward Hindutva.

Personal life 
Truschke has three children.

See also
 Anti-Hindu sentiment
 Muslim conquests in the Indian subcontinent

Footnotes

Notes

References

External links
 Hindutva Harassment Field Manual
 The Hindu Right cannot debate me because it rejects critical thought: Audrey Truschke

Historians of South Asia
Rutgers University faculty
Living people
Year of birth missing (living people)
Hindutva harassment of scholars
American women historians
21st-century American historians
21st-century American women writers
American women academics
University of Chicago alumni
Columbia Graduate School of Arts and Sciences alumni
Stanford University fellows